Manirampur Government High School (MGHS) is a public boys' school located in Manirampur Upazila under Jessore District, Bangladesh. It is a state school located at the intersections of Jessore-Satkhira Highway and Manirampur-Jhikargacha Road.

History

The school was established in 1932  during the reign of British Government in Indian subcontinent. The school was approved in 1958 during the reign of  Pakistan Government, in then East Pakistan.
Because of the restless efforts and cooperation of Alhajj Mufti Mawlana Mohammad Wakkas, the state minister of religion of the  Government of People's Republic of Bangladesh, the then President Alhajj Hussain Muhammad Ershad announced and then implemented the school as a Government school on February 2, 1987. The school follows the SSC curriculum in Bengali medium under the Board of Intermediate and Secondary Education, Jessore. The EIIN is 116119. The school code is 6224.

Name history
 Manirampur M. E. School (1932-'40)
 Manirampur Junior High School (1940-'57)
 Manirampur English High School (1957-'58)
 Manirampur Thana Model High School (1959-'62)
 Manirampur Multipurpose (Bohumukhee) High School (1962-'87)
 Manirampur Government Pilot High School (1987-....)
 Manirampur Government High School (....-Present)

Campus

The school campus is located at the manorial of Hakoba in Manirampur sadar which is bounded by Jessore-Satkhira highway and cove of river Harihar at the east, village Hakoba at the west, Manirampur-Jhikargacha road at the north and river Harihar at the south.

The campus has an area of 3.98 acres. The school has three buildings attached together. The old buildings are two storeyed and the new building is three storeyed.

There is a mosque in the campus which was built by the money of Masjid Fund raised by the students' fees.

There is a Shaheed Minar (Monument of Martyrs) at the campus which was used as the Central Shaheed Minar of Manirampur upazila till 2015 before construction of Manirampur's new Central Shaheed Minar at Upazila complex.

The campus has two playgrounds. One is used for daily assembly and other is used for sports. The playground is also used as a venue of annual Book Fair & other fairs and as a public stadium for holding different sports of the Upazila.

Manirampur Government Primary School is situated at the south-east corner within the campus.

Headmasters' directory

Structure

The school enrolls students from class (grade) 6 to 10. The school operates in one shift. Each class has average 60 students. Class 9 and 10 are subdivided into three sections: science, arts, and commerce group.

Admission

Students are to participate in 'admission test' for the chance of admission to this school. Usually students are admitted in class 6 to 9. The admission test is taken usually in December after the 'Annual exam' ( also called yearly exam) of the school.

Daily assembly

In order to create disciplined mind and obedience, assembly is called every day before schooling. Reciting from Al-Quran, Geeta, oath and singing national anthem of Bangladesh. Thus patriotism and moralities are grown in students' minds.

Uniform

The school uniform is white shirt with navy blue full pant,  white shoes and navy blue sweater (for winter only). The school's monogram is printed on the shirt's pocket and shoulder cuff is provided from school.

Exam system and result

There are two terms in a year. First one is 'Half-yearly' term (January - June) another one is 'Annual' term (July - December). Students get every of their results in their personal score-card.

Teachers-guardians conference

To make each students best from better, a conference is called where they discuss the problems of a student and how to remove those. Thus this school makes a good results in SSC and JSC.

Library

The library has a good collection of books. Most of them were bought by coeval sanctioned money during the establishment of the school. Others were bought by annually approved money.

School magazine

The name of the magazine of the school is Provati. The magazine is not published regularly every year. The school magazine is a historical document of the growth of the school. It informs the future generation of students about the traditions built up of their school. This valuable publication is the opportunity that students require to show their creative talents. Along with academic studies, students are encouraged in games and athletics, art and craft, science clubs, dramatics and various other activities. These make the years in school interesting and worth remembering. But intellectual activities like debates, elocution and essay-writing competitions are rarely found. The school magazine is the window to the activities of the school. Proper initiative by the teachers can help in improving the views and expressions of the students which in turn will raise the standard of the magazine.

Extracurricular sports

The students of MGHS are active in sports. The annual sports competition is organized by the school authority in February each year. Sprints (100 to 400 meters), long jump, and high jump are few to mention among different kinds of sports in which students participate.

Inter school sports competitions are arranged every year that includes cricket, football, handball and other athletics events.

Clubs
 Scouting Club

See also 
 List of schools in Bangladesh
 Education in Bangladesh
 State school
 Jessore District

Citations

References

External links
 Manirampur Government High School - Official Website
 MANIRAMPUR GOVT. SECONDARY SCHOOL

Educational institutions established in 1932
Schools in Jessore District
Boys' schools in Bangladesh
High schools in Bangladesh
State schools
1932 establishments in India